The Roxbury Plaza (a.k.a. Manufacturers Bank and Roar Building) is a landmark building and thirteen-floor office tower in Beverly Hills, California.

Location
It is located at 9701 on Wilshire Boulevard in Beverly Hills, California.

History
It was designed in the Late Modern architectural style by renowned architect Anthony J. Lumsden (1928–2011). Construction was completed in 1974. Lumsden subsequently received the First Honor Award from the Society of American Registered Architects for his work.

Originally known as the Manufacturers Bank, it is now called the Roxbury Plaza.

References

External links
Picture from WorldCat

Buildings and structures in Beverly Hills, California
High-tech architecture

Office buildings completed in 1974